Renal dysplasia-limb defects syndrome (RL syndrome), also known as Ulbright–Hodes syndrome, is a very rare autosomal recessive congenital disorder. It has been described in three infants, all of whom died shortly after birth.

Presentation
RL syndrome is characterized by renal dysplasia, growth retardation, phocomelia or mesomelia, radiohumeral fusion (joining of radius and humerus), rib abnormalities, anomalies of the external genitalia and potter-like facies among many others.

Genetics

RL syndrome is inherited in an autosomal recessive manner. This means the defective gene responsible for the disorder is located on an autosome, and two copies of the defective gene (one inherited from each parent) are required in order to be born with the disorder. The parents of an individual with an autosomal recessive disorder both carry one copy of the defective gene, but usually do not experience any signs or symptoms of the disorder.

Diagnosis

Treatment

References

External links 

Autosomal recessive disorders
Congenital disorders
Rare syndromes
Genetic disorders with OMIM but no gene